Woolsthorpe may refer to  

 Woolsthorpe, Victoria, a town in Victoria, Australia